The Murray to Mountains Rail Trail is a cycling and walking rail trail in northern Victoria, Australia. It extends from Wangaratta to Bright, with a side branch to Beechworth, following the route of the former Bright railway line. This side branch trail is planned to be extended from Beechworth to Yackandandah. AU$12m was budgeted by the Victoria State Government for this extension in May 2017.  Unusually for a rail trail, it is sealed for virtually the entire distance of approximately 95 kilometres.

Another section, from Rutherglen to Wahgunyah on the Murray was completed in 2009. There is an on-road "preferred route" connecting Rutherglen to Bowser via Chiltern. A third section extends south from Wangaratta to Oxley, connecting with a bike path from there to Milawa.

Stages

Landmarks are as follows:
Wangaratta
Bowser (8 km)
Londrigan former station (3 km)
Tarrawingee former station (8 km)
Everton former station (6 km)
Beechworth branch:
Baarmutha former station (10 km)
Beechworth (5 km)
Everton (1 km)
Brooksfield former station (5 km)
Bowman former station (8 km)
Gapsted former station (6 km)
Myrtleford (8 km)
Ovens (5 km)
Eurobin (former station) (9 km)
Porepunkah (8 km)
Bright (7 km)

References

External links
Murray to the Mountains official website
railtrails.org

Rail trails in Victoria (Australia)
Beechworth